Erisa Ssekisambu (born 28 August 1995) is a Ugandan footballer who plays for Kiyovu Sports Club in the Rwandan Premier League and the Uganda national team as a midfielder.

Career
Ssekisambu has featured for different clubs in Uganda such as SC Villa, Express, Uganda Revenue Authority SC, Vipers SC and of recent he played for currently in KCCA FC.

SC Villa
Ssekisambu started his career in 2011. He made his debut on 23 September 2011 against Police FC and he scored his first goal on 18 January 2011 against Gulu United, SC Villa won 4–0. Ssekisambu left SC Villa for Express hoping to get the playing time he had not got at Villa Park since coach Srdjan Zivojnov, had not given him the playing time.

Express
Ssekisambu joined Express in January 2012. He played his first game on 22 February 2012 against Water FC and the game ended 0–0. He scored his first goal against Masaka Local Council FC on 29 May 2012 and Express won 1–0.

Uganda Revenue Authority SC
In June 2012 Ssekisambu joined Uganda Revenue Authority SC from Express

SC Villa
Ssekisambu returned to SC Villa in 2015. He played against Soana FC as his first game on a comeback to SC Villa. He scored his first goal of the season against Express and the match ended in favour of SC Villa 2–1.

Vipers SC
In July 2015, Ssekisambu moved to Vipers SC in 2015., He played his first game against Bidco FC, Vipers SC won 1–0. He scored his first goal for Vipers SC against Saints FC. Ssekisambu completed the season with a tally of 16 goals even when some pundits argue that he scored 17 during the Uganda Premier League season of 2015–16 Sekisambu scored a historical goal for Vipers SC against Enyimba FC on 12 February 2016 in the preliminary round of CAF Champions League first leg.

Gor Mahia
On 1 November 2018, it was announced that Ssekisambu had joined Kenyan club Gor Mahia on a two-year contract. On 16 February 2019 he scored his first hattrick for Gor Mahia against Mount Kenya United.

International career
On 20 June 2015, he made his senior debut on the Uganda against Tanzania and scored 2 goals on his debut. He was one of the shining stars at the 2016 CHAN Finals in Rwanda as he netted in the 2–2 draw with Mali.

In the 2014 African Nations Championship, Erisa was top scorer for Uganda.

Career statistics

Club

International

Honours

Club
Express
 Ugandan Premier League: 2011–12

Uganda Revenue Authority SC
 Uganda Cup: 2013–14:

SC Villa
 Ugandan Cup: 2014

Vipers SC
 Ugandan Cup: 2015–16
 Ugandan Premier League: 2017–18

Uganda
CECAFA Cup: 2015

Individual
 Most Valuable Player Ugandan Cup: 2015, 2016
 Most Valuable Player Nominee Uganda Premier League: 2015

References

External links
 
 

1995 births
Living people
Association football midfielders
Ugandan footballers
Ugandan expatriate footballers
Uganda international footballers
Uganda A' international footballers
SC Villa players
Uganda Revenue Authority SC players
Vipers SC players
Gor Mahia F.C. players
Kampala Capital City Authority FC players
Uganda Premier League players
Ugandan expatriate sportspeople in Kenya
Expatriate footballers in Kenya
People from Wakiso District
2016 African Nations Championship players